John R. Tunheim (born September 1, 1953) is an American lawyer who serves as a United States district judge of the United States District Court for the District of Minnesota.

Education and career

Tunheim was born in Thief River Falls, Minnesota in 1953. He attended Concordia College in Moorhead, Minnesota, and received a Bachelor of Arts degree in 1975. He obtained his legal education from the University of Minnesota Law School and received his Juris Doctor in 1980. Tunheim then became a law clerk to Judge Earl Larson of the United States District Court for the District of Minnesota from 1980 to 1981, and was in private practice in St. Paul, Minnesota from 1981 to 1984. He was an attorney in the Office of the State Attorney General of Minnesota from 1984 to 1995, serving as an assistant state attorney general and the manager of the Public Affairs Litigation Division from 1984 to 1985, as Minnesota state solicitor general from 1985 to 1986, and as chief deputy state attorney general from 1986 to 1995. He was an adjunct professor in the University of Minnesota Law School in 1994. Tunheim also served as chairman of the Assassination Records Review Board, which oversaw the collection of records relating to the assassination of John F. Kennedy, from 1994 to 1995.

Federal judicial service

On July 10, 1995, Tunheim was nominated by President Clinton to a seat on the United States District Court for the District of Minnesota vacated by Donald Alsop. Tunheim was confirmed by the Senate on December 22, 1995, and received his commission on December 26, 1995. He served as chief judge from July 1, 2015 to June 30, 2022. He has sat by designation on both the Eighth and Ninth Circuit Courts of Appeals. Tunheim served on the federal judiciary's Committee on Court Administration and Case Management from 2000 to 2009, and chaired it from 2005.

References

External links 
 
 Appearances at the U.S. Supreme Court from the Oyez Project
Minnesota judge: CIA ‘probably misled’ panel he led on JFK assassination
Judge John Tunheim to Chair Humphrey School Advisory Council. University of Minnesota Humphrey School of Public Affairs (2009).

1953 births
Living people
20th-century American judges
21st-century American judges
Concordia College (Moorhead, Minnesota) alumni
Judges of the United States District Court for the District of Minnesota
People from Thief River Falls, Minnesota
United States district court judges appointed by Bill Clinton
University of Minnesota Law School alumni